The Royal Conservatoire of Liège (RCL) (French Conservatoire royal de Liège, Dutch Koninklijk Conservatorium Luik) is one of four conservatories in the French Community of Belgium that offers higher education courses in music and theatre. Located at 29 Piercot Forgeur in the city of Liège, the school's principal building was built in 1887 using a neoclassical design by architects Louis Boonen and Laurent Demany. Inside the building is a large concert hall, the Salle philharmonique de Liège, which has recently been entirely renovated. The hall is the major performance venue for the Orchestre Philharmonique de Liège.

The RCL was founded in 1826 by William I of the Netherlands. Joseph Daussoigne-Méhul served as the school's first director from 1827-1862. Jean-Théodore Radoux was director of the conservatory from 1872-1911.

Notable faculty
 Théo Charlier
 Jeanne Demessieux
 Julien Ghyoros

Notable alumni
 Bratislav Anastasijević
 Gaston Dethier
 Camille Everardi
 César Franck
 Frantz Jehin-Prume
 Sophie Karthäuser
 Marc Laho
 Ovide Musin
 Hasan Cihat Örter
 Jean Rogister
 Adolphe Samuel
 Eugène Ysaÿe
 Wenbo Xin

References

External links
 

Buildings and structures in Liège
Education in Liège
Drama schools in Belgium
Music schools in Belgium
Organisations based in Belgium with royal patronage
1826 establishments in the Southern Netherlands